The Main National Liberation Committee for Serbia was the body of the "National Liberation Movement" (the Yugoslav Communists and Yugoslav Partisans) in German-occupied Serbia, recognized within the movement as the civilian government in Serbia. It was established in October or November 1941, active during the Republic of Užice, a short-lived liberated territory in western Serbia in the second half of 1941, and in 1944–45 during the liberation of Yugoslavia.

According to V. Vinterhalter, the "Main National Liberation Committee for Serbia" was established on 16 November in liberated Užice. A letter issued by Tito on 16 November stresses that a "Central Committee for all of the liberated territory ... had now been established" in Užice. The organization was thus called the Central Committee for Liberated Territory (Centralni odbor za oslobođenu teritoriju). The Central Committee of the Communist Party of Yugoslavia (CK KPJ) appointed the Committee on 17 November. Its establishment had been initiated by the leadership of the National Liberation Movement for Serbia, with consent of the National Liberation Movement of Yugoslavia (NOP Jugoslavije, the war-time KPJ). The President was Dragojlo Dudić, and Secretary was Petar Stambolić. The organization did not hold any official assemblies. The organization became defunct with the renewed German occupation, only to resurface in November 1944 as the "Main National Liberation Committee for Serbia".

Organization

Members
1941
The President was Dragojlo Dudić, and Secretary was Petar Stambolić. Other members were Mitra Mitrović (Education and culture), Vlada Zečević (Trade, supplies, forestry and mining), Milentije Popović (Transport), Mirko Tomić (Health), Nikola Grulović, Mitar Bakić, Jovan Popović, and Jusuf Tuluć.

See also
Anti-fascist Assembly for the National Liberation of Serbia
Provincial Committee for Serbia

Annotations
Also known in Serbo-Croatian as Glavni NOO Srbije or Glavni NOO za Srbiju. "NOO" is the acronym Narodnooslobodilački odbor ("National Liberation Committee").

References

Sources
 

  

Serbia in World War II
1941 establishments in Serbia
Serbia under German occupation
Yugoslav Partisans
1945 disestablishments in Serbia
Defunct organizations based in Serbia
Organizations based in Yugoslavia
Communism in Serbia
Communist organizations in Europe